Professional wrestling is a fictional version of a combat sport.

Pro wrestling may also refer to:

Video games
Pro Wrestling (NES video game), Nintendo's wrestling video game
Pro Wrestling (Sega Master System video game), Sega's wrestling video game